Thall (Ṭəl) is a town in Thall Tehsil of Hangu District in Khyber-Pakhtunkhwa province of Pakistan. Thall is located at 33°21'52N 70°32'52E with an altitude of 742 metres (2437 feet).

Overview and history 

It is administratively subdivided into two Union Councils. It is separated from the North Waziristan Agency by the Kurram River. The Peshawar-Thall and Thall-Parachinar road passes from here which is an important route of this area. It is around 4 hours drive from Peshawar and about 3 hours from Kohat.

A major Bazaar or market of this region is located here which is a hub for traders from Kurram agency, Afghanistan and adjoining areas. The Historic Thall fort built by the British in 1909 is located here, which serves as the HQ for Thall Scouts, a Paramilitary unit of FC.
During hot weather people visit the Wali Chena (Wali Spring), a small spring with cold water, where they can bathe. There is a small forest named Toor Koot, which is popular for outings and picnics.

Population 
The population of Thall (Tall), according to 1998 consensus, is 25,355. The population of Thall, according to official consensus, over the years is shown in the table below.

Education 
There are many public and private sector educational institutes. The most prominent are Govt Degree College Thall (boys) and Govt Girls Degree College Thall (girls).

See also 
 Hangu District

References

Union councils of Hangu District
Populated places in Hangu District, Pakistan